Nzara County is a county in Western Equatoria State, South Sudan. And was part of Yambio county before South Sudan's independence.

History 
Nzara County was part of Western Equatoria State when South Sudan became independent. Nzara County became part of Gbudwe State in 2015, but reverted to Western Equatoria State when that state was reestablished in 2020.

In 2018, 20 of the 21 public primary schools in the county were closed due to unpaid teacher salaries. In February 2020, a wildfire in Nzara County killed one person and left hundreds homeless. Nzara County experienced heavy flooding in November 2020 when the Yubu River overflowed, destroying 70 homes.

Geography 
Nzara County borders Ezo County to the west, Yambio County to the east being bored by Ri Rongu, Wulu County to the north, and the Democratic Republic of the Congo to the south. The Nzara River runs through the county. Nzara and Sakure are the two major towns in the county.

References 

Counties of South Sudan
Western Equatoria